Pamela Palmer is a National Best Selling author of romance novels. Her Feral Warrior books are published through Avon Books, her Esri books are published through Silhouette Nocturne, and her Jewels of Time books are published through Berkley Sensation.

Biography
Pamela Palmer grew up in an Air Force household as her father was an Air Force pilot. She dreamed of being an astronaut as a child. She graduated Auburn University with a degree in Industrial Engineering and began working for a major computer manufacturer. She eventually turned to writing after having married and given birth to two children. She has also written under the name Pamela Montgomerie. As Montgomerie she writes historical time travel romance novels, while as using her real name, Palmer, she writes dark paranormal romance.

Bibliography

As Pamela Palmer

The Feral Warriors
Desire Untamed (2009)
Obsession Untamed (2009)
Passion Untamed (2009)
Rapture Untamed (2010)
Hunger Untamed (2011)
Ecstasy Untamed (2011)
Love Untamed (2012)
Wulfe Untamed (2014)

The Esri series
The Dark Gate (2007)
Dark Deceiver (2008)
A Warrior's Desire (2012)
Warrior Rising (2012)

Vamp City series
A Blood Seduction (2012)
A Kiss of Blood (2013)
Of Blood and Passion (2015)

As Pamela Montgomerie

Jewels of Time
Sapphire Dream (2009)
Amethyst Destiny (2010)

Anthologies
Hearts Untamed in Bitten by Cupid (2010) with Lynsay Sands and Jamie Rush. Part of the Feral Warriors series
A Forever Love in Vampires Gone Wild (2013) with Kerrelyn Sparks, Amanda Arista, and Kim Falconer. Part of the Vamp City series

References

External links
Pamela Palmer's Official Website

Living people
21st-century American novelists
American romantic fiction writers
American women novelists
21st-century American women writers
Auburn University alumni
Year of birth missing (living people)
Place of birth missing (living people)